Oginishiki Yasutoshi (born 8 July 1971 as Yasutoshi Koiwai) is a former sumo wrestler from Ichikawa, Chiba Prefecture, Japan. His highest rank was komusubi. His father and brother were also sumo wrestlers. He is now a coach at Dewanoumi stable.

Career
The son of former sekiwake Oginohana Masaaki, he joined Dewanoumi stable in March 1987, where his father worked as a coach, and four years after his elder brother Oginohana Akikazu had also joined the stable. The "Ogi" character in his shikona was taken from Ogi, Saga where his father was born. Initially wrestling under his own surname of Koiwai, he switched to Oginoshu in 1989 and then Oginishiki in 1990. He reached sekitori status in November 1991 upon promotion to the jūryō division and the top makuuchi division in May 1993, joining his brother who had first reached makuuchi in January 1990.

Oginishiki had a more successful top division career than his brother, who reached a highest rank of maegashira 2 and never managed to win a special prize or defeat a yokozuna. Oginishiki, by contrast, earned the Fighting Spirit award in only his third makuuchi tournament after a strong 11-4 record. Two tournaments later in March 1994 he defeated yokozuna Akebono and was awarded the Technique Prize. In November 1996 he defeated all three ozeki but could only score 6-9 overall. In May 1997, an 11-4 record at Maegashira 4 saw him pick up his second Technique award and earn promotion to sumo's fourth highest rank of komusubi. He could only manage four wins in his sanyaku debut however, and never managed to return to the rank. In May 1998 he defeated yokozuna Takanohana and tournament winner Wakanohana and won the Outstanding Performance award. At the end of 1999 he dropped back into the jūryō division but two consecutive yusho or tournament championships saw him return to the top division. He suffered a number of injury problems later in his career, and fell to jūryō once more.

After making his final top division appearance in March 2002, he fought until January 2004 before retiring on the 12th day with eight losses, facing certain demotion to makushita.

Retirement from sumo
Oginishiki has stayed in the sumo world as a coach at Dewanoumi stable, alongside his brother, and is now known as Nakadachi-oyakata.

Career record

See also
Glossary of sumo terms
List of sumo tournament second division champions
List of past sumo wrestlers
List of sumo elders
List of komusubi

References

External links

1971 births
Living people
Japanese sumo wrestlers
People from Ichikawa, Chiba
Sumo people from Chiba Prefecture
Komusubi